Paul McLeod (born 22 May 1987) is a Scottish professional footballer. After his release by Albion Rovers in January 2011, he has recently signed for Glasgow Junior side Petershill, and he made his debut as a substitute in an Emirates Scottish Junior Cup 4th Round tie at Dunbar United on 19 February 2011.

Career
McLeod made his debut for Hamilton Academical against Queen of the South on 1 January 2005, scoring the winner for Accies. After playing in the Hamilton first team for a while, he was twice loaned out to Second Division side Alloa Athletic; the first time in the 2005-06 season and then again during the 2006-07 season.

After being rewarded with a new contract, McLeod was once again loaned out to a Second Division side, this time Ayr United.

McLeod was released by Hamilton in September 2008. He then joined Dumbarton. He spent a year with the Sons, winning the Scottish Third Division, before signing for Clyde. He was released from his contract in December 2009, after making 17 appearances, scoring 3 goals.

Honours
Dumbarton

Scottish Division Three (fourth tier): Winners 2008–09

References

External links

 (Dumbarton stats)

Living people
1987 births
Footballers from Bellshill
Scottish footballers
Hamilton Academical F.C. players
Alloa Athletic F.C. players
Ayr United F.C. players
Dumbarton F.C. players
Clyde F.C. players
Albion Rovers F.C. players
Scottish Football League players
Association football forwards